Scaevola collaris is a shrub in the family Goodeniaceae and its native range is five mainland states/territories of Australia: the Northern Territory, New South Wales, South Australia, Queensland and Western Australia.

It is an endangered species in New South Wales.

Description 
Scaevola collaris is an erect shrub, growing to 0.5 m. The stems are erect and smooth. The leaves are sessile (i.e., have no stalk), succulent and smooth, and 1-8.5 cm long by 1–9 mm wide.
The flowers occur in terminal spikes or are solitary or clustered in the axils.

The sepals are ovate to triangular, smooth and almost free. The corolla is 6-17mm long, smooth on the outside with short hairs on the inside, and yellow to cream or mauve. The anthers are free.
The ovary is inferior and from 5–20 mm long, is two-celled and usually has a beak and a foot.

It flowers mostly from May to November.

Distribution
It is found on saline soils in the arid parts of the south of Western Australia, the south of the Northern Territory, South Australia, western Queensland and north-western New South Wales.

Naming
It was first described in 1859 by Ferdinand von Mueller, and the specific epithet, collaris, comes from the Latin, collaris (having a collar). It was transferred to the genus, Goodenia, in 2020 by Kelly Anne Shepherd and others. Goodenia collaris is the name accepted by the WA herbarium.

Gallery

References

External links
 Scaevola collaris (Flickr search)

collaris
Plants described in 1859
Taxa named by Ferdinand von Mueller